Jennifer Jeanine Shaw (born September 15, 1983) is an American film director and producer

Biography
Shaw was born in Albany, Georgia, the daughter of Dr. Pamella Shaw, a University administrator and Eugene Shaw an engineer. She attended the University of Kentucky and New York University's Tisch School of Arts for Television and Film. She graduated in 2006.

References

See also

African-American film directors
Living people
1983 births
People from Kentucky
People from Albany, Georgia
Tisch School of the Arts alumni
University of Kentucky alumni
Kentucky women directors
Film directors from Georgia (U.S. state)